The Connacht Minor Football Championship is an annual Gaelic football competition organised by the Connacht Council of the Gaelic Athletic Association since 1928 for the youngest competitors (under-18 until 2017, now under-17) in the province of Connacht in Ireland. It is currently sponsored by Electric Ireland and therefore officially known as the Electric Ireland Connacht GAA Football Minor Championship.

The series of games are played during the summer months with the Connacht final currently being played in July. The minor final provides the curtain-raiser to the senior final.

The Connacht Championship is an integral part of the wider All-Ireland Minor Football Championship.  The winners of the Connacht final, like their counterparts in the other provincial championships, are rewarded by advancing to the quarter-final stage of the All-Ireland series of games. The losers of the Connacht final also enter the All-Ireland series at the quarter-final stage.

Top winners

List of finals

 1989 Provincial council decides to replay: disputed penalty goal
 1951 Roscommon awarded title on objection
 1949 Sligo awarded title on objection

References

Sources
 Roll of Honour on www.gaainfo.com
 Complete Roll of Honour on Kilkenny GAA bible

All-Ireland Minor Football Championship
 Connacht
1